Emilio Martínez González (born 2 February 2003) is a Mexican professional footballer who plays as a right-back for Liga MX club Puebla.

Career statistics

Club

Honours
Mexico U20
Revelations Cup: 2021

References

External links
 
 
 

Living people
2003 births
Mexican footballers
Mexico youth international footballers
Association football defenders
Club Puebla players
Liga MX players
Footballers from Veracruz
Sportspeople from Córdoba, Veracruz